Hallelujah! I'm a Bum is the seventh studio album by Chicago-based rock band Local H. Interviews with the band have revealed that it is a concept album based on politics in the United States. Although the album was completed in spring of 2012, the band chose to release it in September as to be closer to the 2012 presidential election. The album makes frequent use of the sounds of the El Train in Chicago to transition songs.

The album's title is inspired by the Al Jolson film of the same name.

The song "Look Who's Walking on Four Legs Again" is performed by Scott Lucas's second band Scott Lucas and the Married Men.

Track listing

Personnel
Scott Lucas – guitar, vocals, bass, synthesizer, organ
Brian St. Clair – drums
Dave Lugo, Felix Pinero, and Mike Grogan - Additional vocals on tracks 4 and 9.
Jeb Bishop - Trombone on Track 11.
Bruce Lamont - Trombone on Track 11, Saxophone on Track 14.
Dave Rempis - Saxophone on Track 11.
Jamie Branch - Trumpet on Track 11.
Sanford Parker - Recording and Mixing
Andy Gerber - Additional Mixing
Collin Jordan - Mastering

Charts

References

2012 albums
Concept albums
Local H albums
Political music albums by American artists
2012 United States presidential election in popular culture